Antoni Krzysztof Piechniczek (born 3 May 1942) is a Polish former football player and manager. From 2007 to 2011 he was a Polish senator.

Playing career 
Piechniczek was born in Chorzów. He played for clubs such as Naprzód Lipiny, Legia Warszawa, Ruch Chorzów and LB Châteauroux. He played also three matches for Poland national team.

Managerial career 
As a football coach he has led teams such as Ruch Chorzów, Górnik Zabrze, Al Rayyan (Qatar) or Espérance Tunis (Tunisia).

He is well known for coaching Poland national team. He coached Poland from 1981 to 1986 and from 1996 to 1997. He coached Poland at 1982 FIFA World Cup, where Poland won the bronze medal and at the 1986 FIFA World Cup.

He coached also Tunisia and United Arab Emirates.

Political career 
In the 2002 local election Piechniczek was elected to the Silesian Regional Assembly II Term and was one of the three Vice-Chairpersons of the assembly. In 2006 he was re-elected, but his term (Assembly III Term) was ended after one year. In 2007 Piechniczek was elected to the Senate of the Republic of Poland (upper chamber of Polish parliament) and since 2007-11-05 he is a senator VII Term.

References

Sportspeople from Chorzów
1942 births
Living people
Sportspeople from Silesian Voivodeship
Polish footballers
Association football defenders
Poland international footballers
Ligue 2 players
Ruch Chorzów players
Legia Warsaw players
LB Châteauroux players
Polish football managers
1982 FIFA World Cup managers
1986 FIFA World Cup managers
Odra Opole managers
Ruch Chorzów managers
Poland national football team managers
Espérance Sportive de Tunis managers
Tunisia national football team managers
United Arab Emirates national football team managers
Górnik Zabrze managers
Al-Rayyan SC managers
Polish expatriate football managers
Polish expatriate sportspeople in Tunisia
Expatriate football managers in Tunisia
Polish expatriate sportspeople in the United Arab Emirates
Expatriate football managers in the United Arab Emirates
Polish expatriate sportspeople in Qatar
Expatriate football managers in Qatar